is a former Japanese football player. He is the current goalkeeper coach J2 League club of Thespakusatsu Gunma.

Playing career
Watanabe was born in Kanagawa Prefecture on January 19, 1971. After graduating from International Budo University, he joined the Regional Leagues club NEC Yamagata (later Montedio Yamagata) in 1993. The club was promoted to Japan Football League (JFL) from 1994. He also played many matches as goalkeeper. In 1998, he moved to the JFL club Denso and played as regular goalkeeper. In 1999, he moved to the newly promoted J2 League club, Omiya Ardija. However he played less often than Atsushi Shirai. He retired at the end of the 2002 season.

Club statistics

References

External links

1971 births
Living people
International Budo University alumni
Association football people from Kanagawa Prefecture
Japanese footballers
J2 League players
Japan Football League (1992–1998) players
Montedio Yamagata players
FC Kariya players
Omiya Ardija players
Association football goalkeepers